Daniel Webster Highway (also known as D.W. Highway or Webster Highway) is the name for several sections of U.S. Route 3 (or former alignments) in New Hampshire.  The highway is named after 19th century statesman Daniel Webster, a New Hampshire native.

Extent
The following sections (or former sections) of U.S. Route 3 are named "Daniel Webster Highway":
From the Massachusetts state line to the south end of Main St. in Nashua (formerly U.S. 3)
From the southern boundary of Merrimack to the northern boundary of Bedford
From Webster St. in northern Manchester to the northern boundary of Hooksett
From U.S. Route 4 in the center of Boscawen to the southern boundary of Franklin
In Belmont from the boundary with Tilton to the Laconia Bypass
From Endicott St. in Weirs Beach, through Meredith, to the northern boundary of Center Harbor
From Bridgewater at its boundary with Ashland to the south end of Main St. in Plymouth
From the north end of Main St. in Plymouth, through Campton and Thornton, to the south end of Main St. in North Woodstock
From the southern boundary of Lincoln to the merge with Interstate 93 in Franconia Notch
From Interstate 93 north of Franconia Notch to Union St. in Whitefield
From the southern boundary of Stratford to the northern boundary of Columbia
From the southern boundary of Clarksville to the west end of Main St. in Pittsburg
From the east end of Main St. in Pittsburg to the Canada–US border

South Nashua
Running from Tyngsborough, Massachusetts up to the junction of Main Street, South Main Street, and East Dunstable Road, D.W. Highway in Nashua is the main thoroughfare for the South Nashua Commercial District in the southeastern portion of the city. Before the construction of the Everett Turnpike, this was also designated as U.S. Route 3.
Access between the D.W. Highway and Route 3/Everett Turnpike:
 Full access via East Dunstable Road at Turnpike Exit 4.
 Partial access at Turnpike Exit 3; there is no Turnpike exit on the northbound side. 
 Full access between the two roads at Turnpike Exit 2 (Circumferential Highway).
 Full access via Spit Brook Road at Turnpike Exit 1.
 Partial access at Route 3 Massachusetts Exit 91 (Middlesex Road); there is no southbound Route 3 exit here.

Merrimack and Bedford
The main road in Merrimack, the highway runs from the southeastern to northeastern portion of town, just east of the Everett Turnpike. It continues into Bedford, crossing to the west of the Everett Turnpike, and passing through the town's main commercial district, ending at the town's northern border with Manchester, where it becomes Second Street.Access between the D.W. Highway and the Turnpike:
 At Turnpike Exit 7 via the Henri Burque Highway to Concord Street.
 At Turnpike Exit 10 (Industrial Drive)
 At Turnpike Exit 11 (Continental Boulevard)
 At Turnpike Exit 12 (Bedford Road)
 At New Hampshire Route 101 in Bedford, just west of Interstate 293 Exit 3 (where it merges with the Everett Turnpike)

North of Manchester into Hooksett
Beginning at Webster Street near Livingston Park in north Manchester, heading past Interstate 93, this D.W. Highway is the main commercial thoroughfare in Hooksett, continuing northbound east of the Merrimack River to the town boundary with Allenstown, where US 3 becomes Allenstown Road.

See also

References

Auto trails in the United States
New Hampshire highways
U.S. Route 3